Aetheometra is a monotypic moth genus in the family Geometridae. Its only species is Aetheometra iconoclasis. Both the genus and species were first described by Prout in 1931.

References

Ennominae
Geometridae genera
Monotypic moth genera